Tony Geidmintis (30 July 1949 – 16 April 1993) was an English professional footballer who played as a defender, making over 450 appearances in the Football League.

Career
Born in Stepney, Geidmintis made his Football League debut for Workington on 3 April 1965, aged just 15 years 247 days. He also played in the Football League for Watford, Northampton Town and Halifax Town, before returning in 1980 to a Workington side which had dropped into non-league football. He retired in the 1980–81 season, aged 31, due to a heart condition that contributed to his death 12 years later.

References

1949 births
1993 deaths
English footballers
Workington A.F.C. players
Watford F.C. players
Northampton Town F.C. players
Halifax Town A.F.C. players
English Football League players
Footballers from Stepney
Association football defenders